Cyril Thomas Culverwell (22 October 1895 – 29 October 1963) was a British Conservative Party politician.

He was elected at a by-election in February 1928 as the Member of Parliament (MP) for Bristol West. He was re-elected at the next 3 elections, and held the seat until the 1945 general election, which he did not contest.

In 1938, Culverwell caused controversy by writing an article for  the Bristol Evening Post of 7 November 1938, which praised Nazi Germany. The next year, November 1939 Culverwell drew further criticism when he called for "Peace by negotiation" with Nazi Germany, arguing that the continuation of the war would strengthen the Soviet Union. Culverwell added that "I can even visualise our troops fighting side by side with the Germans to defeat the Bolshevist menace."

References

External links 
 

1895 births
1963 deaths
Conservative Party (UK) MPs for English constituencies
UK MPs 1924–1929
UK MPs 1929–1931
UK MPs 1931–1935
UK MPs 1935–1945
British anti-communists
Alumni of Queens' College, Cambridge